Robert Emmett Lee (1870–1925) was a prolific architect in Hattiesburg, Mississippi.

He was a native of Meridian, Mississippi.  He died suddenly at his home at 463 Southern Avenue, Hattiesburg, when talking with one of his daughters, at age 54.

Career 
Lee designed many works in Hattiesburg, but also elsewhere in South Mississippi, and in Columbus, Mississippi (replacing buildings destroyed by a fire). At least three of his works are listed on the National Register of Historic Places.

Lee's works include:

Walthall School (1902), Hattiesburg, Mississippi, a contributing building in the NRHP-listed Hattiesburg Historic Neighborhood District
Eaton Elementary School (1905), 1105 McInnis Ave. Hattiesburg, Mississippi, NRHP-listed
Hattiesburg Trust & Banking Company (1905), a contributing building in the NRHP-listed Hub City Historic District.
Ross Building (1907), Hattiesburg
Masonic Temple (1920), Hattiesburg
Old Hattiesburg High School (front addition, 1921), 846 Main St., Hattiesburg, the only known Jacobethan Style work by Lee, NRHP-listed
City Hall (1923), Hattiesburg
I.O.O.F. Lodge No. 27 (1927), Hattiesburg
a school (1927), Brooklyn, Mississippi
First Presbyterian Church, Hattiesburg
Main Street Baptist Church, Hattiesburg

References

1870 births
1925 deaths
19th-century American architects
People from Hattiesburg, Mississippi
People from Meridian, Mississippi
20th-century American architects